Earl Van Dorn (September 17, 1820May 7, 1863) was an American major-general who started his military career as a United States Army officer but joined Confederate forces in 1861 after the Civil War broke out. He was a major general when he was killed in a private conflict.

A great-nephew of Andrew Jackson, he received an appointment to the United States Military Academy, graduating in 1842. He was notable for fighting with distinction during the Mexican–American War and against several tribes of Native Americans in the West.

In the American Civil War, he sided with the Confederacy, fighting in the Western Theater as a major general. He was appointed commander of the Trans-Mississippi District. At the Battle of Pea Ridge, Arkansas, in early March 1862, he was defeated by a smaller U.S. force. He had abandoned his supply wagons for speed, leaving his men under-equipped in cold weather. At the Second Battle of Corinth in October 1862, he was again defeated through a failure of reconnaissance and was removed from high command. He scored two notable successes as a cavalry commander, capturing a large U.S. supply depot in the Holly Springs Raid and an enemy brigade at the Battle of Thompson's Station, Tennessee. Van Dorn's successful raid of Holly Springs delayed the potential expulsion of Jewish people from U.S. General Ulysses S. Grant's military district.

Van Dorn's reputation was restored but short-lived. In May 1863, he was shot dead at his headquarters at Spring Hill by a doctor who claimed that Van Dorn had carried on an affair with his wife. Van Dorn never achieved military greatness but was considered a brilliant cavalry commander.

Early life and career
Van Dorn was born near Port Gibson in Claiborne County, Mississippi, to Sophia Donelson Caffery, a niece of Andrew Jackson, and Peter Aaron Van Dorn, a lawyer who had moved from New Jersey years earlier. He had eight siblings, including sisters Emily Van Dorn Miller and Octavia Van Dorn (Ross) Sulivane. His sister Octavia had a son, Clement Sulivane, who became a captain in the CSA forces and served on Van Dorn's staff; he later was promoted to lieutenant colonel.

In 1838, Van Dorn enrolled in the United States Military Academy at West Point. His mother's connection to Andrew Jackson secured him an appointment there. He graduated 52nd out of 68 cadets in the class of 1842. He was appointed a brevet second lieutenant in the 7th U.S. Infantry Regiment on July 1, 1842, and began his army service in the Southern United States.

After graduation, in December 1843, he married Caroline Godbold, daughter of a prominent Alabama planter family. They had two children together: son Earl Van Dorn, Jr. (b. 1855) and daughter Olivia (1852-1878).

Van Dorn and the 7th were on garrison duty at Fort Pike, Louisiana, in 1842–43, and were stationed at Fort Morgan, Alabama, briefly in 1843. He did garrison duty at the Mount Vernon Arsenal in Alabama from 1843 into 1844. He was ordered to Pensacola harbor in Florida from 1844 to 1845, during which Van Dorn was promoted to second lieutenant on November 30, 1844.

War with Mexico
Van Dorn was part of the 7th U.S. Infantry when Texas was occupied by the U.S. Army from 1845 into 1846. During the early stages of the Mexican–American War, he was garrisoned at Fort Texas (Fort Brown) in Brownsville, defending the border from the southernmost town in Texas.

Van Dorn saw action at the Battle of Monterrey on September 21–23, 1846, and during the Siege of Vera Cruz from March 9–29, 1847. He was transferred to Gen. Winfield Scott's command in early 1847 and promoted to first lieutenant on March 3. Van Dorn fought well in the rest of his engagements in Mexico, earning himself two brevet promotions for performance; he was appointed a brevet captain on April 18 for his participation at the Battle of Cerro Gordo, and to major on August 20 for his actions near Mexico City, including the Battle of Contreras, the Battle of Churubusco, and at the Belén Gate. Van Dorn was wounded in the foot near Mexico City on September 3, and wounded again during the storming of Belén Gate on September 13.

After the war with Mexico, Van Dorn served as aide-de-camp to Brev. Maj. Gen Persifor F. Smith from April 3, 1847, to May 20, 1848. He and the 7th were in garrison at Baton Rouge, Louisiana, from 1848 into 1849. Later in 1849, they served at Jefferson Barracks in Lemay, Missouri, south of St. Louis. He saw action in Florida against the Seminoles from 1849 to 1850 as the United States tried to dislodge them from the region. Some Seminoles succeeded in evading those efforts and survived in the Everglades; they were the ancestors of two federally recognized Seminole tribes in Florida today. Van Dorn served with the recruiting service in 1850 and 1851.

From 1852 to 1855, Van Dorn was stationed at the East Pascagoula Branch Military Asylum in Mississippi, serving as secretary and then treasurer of the post. He spent the remainder of 1855 stationed at New Orleans, Louisiana, briefly on recruiting service again, and later garrisoned again at Jefferson Barracks. He was promoted to captain in the 2nd Cavalry on March 3, 1855.

Van Dorn and the 2nd were on frontier duty at Fort Belknap and Camp Cooper, Texas, in 1855 and 1856, scouting in northern Texas in 1856 and fought a minor skirmish with Comanche on July 1, 1856. He was assigned to Camp Colorado, Texas, from 1856 to 1857, scouting duty again in 1857, returned to Camp Colorado from 1857 to 1858, and was finally stationed in 1858 at Fort Chadbourne located in Coke County, Texas.

Van Dorn saw further action against Native Americans: separately against the Seminole, many of whom had been removed to Indian Territory. He also fought against the Comanche, who attacked new Native American settlements there that the United States had promised to protect.

He was wounded four separate times while in Indian Territory, including seriously when he commanded an expedition against the Comanche and took two arrows (one in his left arm and another in his right side, damaging his stomach and lung) at the Battle of Wichita Village on October 1, 1858. Not expected to live, Van Dorn recovered in five weeks. Van Dorn led six companies of cavalry and a company of scouts recruited from the Brazos Reservation in a spring campaign against the Comanche in 1859. He located the camp of Buffalo Hump in Kansas (in a valley he erroneously identified as the Nescutunga (or Nessentunga) and defeated them on May 13, 1859. His forces killed 49 persons, wounded five, and captured 32 Comanche women.

He served at Fort Mason, Texas, in 1859 and 1860. While at Fort Mason, Van Dorn was promoted to major on June 28, 1860. He was absent from the U.S. Army for the rest of 1860 and into 1861.

Civil War service

As the Civil War began, Van Dorn enlisted in the Confederate States Army. He resigned from his U.S. Army commission, which was accepted effective January 31, 1861. He was appointed a brigadier general in the Mississippi Militia on January 23. In February, he replaced Jefferson Davis as major general and commander of Mississippi's state forces after Davis was selected as the Confederacy's President.

After resigning from the Mississippi Militia on March 16, 1861, Van Dorn entered the Regular Confederate States Army as a colonel of infantry on that same date. He was sent west to raise and lead a volunteer brigade within the new Confederate Department of Texas. On April 11, he was given command of Confederate forces in Texas and ordered to arrest and detain any U.S. troops in the state who refused to join the Confederate Army.

Leaving New Orleans on April 14 and arriving at Galveston, Texas, he and his men succeeded in capturing three U.S. ships in the town's harbor on April 17. He and his forces reached the last remaining regular U.S. Army soldiers in Texas at Indianola, forcing their surrender on April 23. While at Indianola, Van Dorn attempted to recruit the captured U.S. soldiers into the Confederate Army but was largely unsuccessful.

Van Dorn was summoned to Richmond, Virginia, and appointed a colonel in the 1st C.S. Regular Cavalry on April 25, leading all of Virginia's cavalry forces. He was quickly promoted to brigadier general on June 5. After being promoted to major general on September 19, 1861, Van Dorn was given divisional command in the Confederate Army of the Potomac five days later, leading the 1st Division until January 10, 1862.

Around this time, Confederate President Davis needed a commander for the new Trans-Mississippi District, as two of the leading Confederate generals there, bitter rivals Sterling Price and Benjamin McCulloch, required a leader to subdue their strong personalities and organize an effective fighting force. Both Henry Heth and Braxton Bragg had turned down the post, and Davis selected Van Dorn. He headed west beginning on January 19 to concentrate his separated commands and set up his headquarters at Pocahontas, Arkansas. He assumed command of the district on January 29, 1862.

Pea Ridge

By early 1862, U.S. forces in Missouri had pushed nearly all Confederate forces out of the state. When Van Dorn took command of the department, he had to react with his roughly 17,000-man, 60-gun Army of the West to events already underway. Van Dorn wanted to attack and destroy the U.S. forces, enter Missouri, and capture St. Louis, turning over control of this important state to the Confederacy. He met his now-concentrated force near Boston Mountains on March 3, and the army began moving north the next day.

In the spring of 1862, U.S. Brig. Gen. Samuel R. Curtis entered Arkansas and pursued the Confederates with his 10,500-strong Army of the Southwest. Curtis collected his four divisions and 50 artillery guns and moved into Benton County, Arkansas, following a stream called Sugar Creek. Along it on the northern side, he found an excellent defensive position. He began to fortify it, expecting an assault from the south. Van Dorn chose not to attack Curtis's entrenched position head-on. Instead, he split his force into two, one division led by Price and the other by McCulloch, and ordered them to march north, hoping to reunite in Curtis' rear. Van Dorn left his supply wagons behind to increase their moving speed, which would prove critical.

Several other factors caused the proposed junction to be delayed, such as the lack of proper gear for the Confederates (some said to lack even shoes) for a forced march, felled trees placed across their path, their exhausted and hungry condition, and the late arrival of McCulloch's men. These delays allowed the U.S. commander to reposition part of his army throughout March 6 and meet the unexpected attack from his rear, placing Curtis' forces between the two wings of the Confederate army. When Van Dorn's advance guard accidentally ran into U.S. patrols near Elm Springs, the U.S. soldiers were alerted to his approach.

The Battle of Pea Ridge would be one of the few instances in the American Civil War where the Confederate forces outnumbered the U.S. forces. Just before taking command of the district, Van Dorn wrote to his wife Caroline, saying, "I am now in for it, to make a reputation and serve my country conspicuously or fail. I must not, shall not, do the latter. I must have St. Louis—then Huzza!"

After waiting for McCulloch to join him, Van Dorn grew frustrated and decided to act with what he had on March 7. Around 9 a.m., he ordered Price to attack the U.S. position close to Elkhorn Tavern. Despite Price being wounded, they had successfully pushed the U.S. forces back by nightfall, cutting Curtis' lines of communication. Meanwhile, under orders from Van Dorn to take a different route and hurry his march, McCulloch had engaged part of Curtis' defenses. Early on in the fighting, McCulloch and Brig. Gen. James M. McIntosh were killed, leaving no commander there to organize an effective attack.

When Van Dorn learned of the problems with his right wing, he renewed Price's attacks, saying, "Then we must press them the harder", and the Confederates pushed Curtis back. That night, the junction of Price and what remained of McCulloch's men was made, and Van Dorn pondered his next move.

The following day, March 8, showed Curtis and his command in an even stronger position, about a mile back from where they were on March 7. Van Dorn had his men arranged defensively in front of Pea Ridge Mountain. When it was light enough, he ordered the last of his artillery's ammunition fired at the U.S. position to see what the U.S. soldiers would do. The U.S. artillery answered, knocking out most of Van Dorn's guns. Curtis then counterattacked and routed the Confederates, mostly without actual contact between the opposing infantries. Van Dorn decided to withdraw south, retreating through the sparse country for a week and his men living off what little they got from the few inhabitants of the region. The Army of the West finally reunited with their supplies south of the Boston Mountains. In his official report, Van Dorn described his summary of the events at Pea Ridge:

Casualties from this battle have never been fully agreed upon. Most military historians give figures of about 1,000 to 1,200 total U.S. soldiers and around 2,000 Confederate.

However, Van Dorn detailed significantly different numbers in his official reports. He stated losses of about 800 killed with 1,000 to 1,200 wounded and 300 prisoners (about 2,300 total) for the United States, and only 800 to 1,000 killed and wounded and between 200 and 300 prisoners (about 1,300 total) from his army.

The Confederate defeat at this battle, coupled with Van Dorn's army being ordered across the Mississippi River to bolster the Army of Tennessee, enabled the United States to regain control of the entire state of Missouri and threaten the heart of Arkansas, left virtually defenseless without Van Dorn's forces. Despite the loss at Pea Ridge, the Confederate Congress would vote its thanks "for their valor, skill, and good conduct in the battle of Elkhorn in the states of Arkansas" to Van Dorn and his men on April 21.

In his report on March 18 to Judah P. Benjamin, then the Confederate Secretary of War, Van Dorn refuted suffering a loss, saying, "I was not defeated, but only foiled in my intentions. I am yet sanguine of success, and will not cease to repeat my blows whenever the opportunity is offered."

Second Corinth

The performance of Van Dorn at the Second Battle of Corinth that autumn led to another U.S. victory. As at Pea Ridge, Van Dorn did well in the early stages of the battle on October 1–2, 1862, combining with Price's men and prudently placing his force that now was roughly equal in size to the U.S. army at about 22,000 soldiers. However, Van Dorn failed to reconnoiter the U.S. defenses, and his attack on Brig. Gen. William S. Rosecrans' strong defensive position at Corinth, Mississippi, on October 3, was bloodily repulsed.

On October 4–5, his command was "roughly handled" along the Hatchie River by U.S. soldiers led by Brig. Gens. Stephen A. Hurlbut and Edward Ord. However, Rosecrans' lack of an aggressive pursuit allowed what was left of Van Dorn's men to escape. Total casualties for the Second Battle of Corinth totaled 2,520 (355 killed, 1,841 wounded, 324 missing) for the U.S. Army and 4,233 (473 killed, 1,997 wounded, 1,763 captured/missing) for the Confederate Army.

After the battle, Van Dorn ordered a retreat, falling back through Abbeville, Oxford, and Water Valley, Mississippi, where he and his staff were nearly captured on December 4, then on to Coffeeville, Mississippi, constantly skirmishing with U.S. cavalry on December 4. Two days later, Van Dorn halted the retreat at Grenada. Following the defeat at Corinth, Van Dorn was sent before a court of inquiry to answer for his performance there. He was acquitted of the charges against him, but Van Dorn would never be trusted with the command of an army again and he was subsequently relieved of his district command.

Return to cavalry service

Holly Springs Raid

Van Dorn proved to be more effective as a cavalry commander, leading the Holly Springs Raid, which seriously disrupted Ulysses S. Grant's first Vicksburg Campaign plans. Van Dorn was upset at being relieved by General John C. Pemberton, and wanted to regain his honor. Obtaining Pemberton's permission, Van Dorn planned a secret raid against Grant, not even telling his soldiers. On December 16, 1862, Van Dorn, with 2,500 fighting cavalry left Grenada, fording the Yalobusha, riding northeast.  At dawn, December 20, Van Dorn and his lightning cavalry struck Holly Springs, capturing 1,500 sleepy U.S. soldiers while destroying at least $1,500,000 worth of U.S. supplies. U.S. post commander Colonel Robert C. Murphy was captured. Six hundred Illinois U.S. cavalry cut loose and escaped Van Dorn's wrath. Local Confederate women at Holly Springs cheered Van Dorn, proclaiming "the Glorious Twentieth".

Grant had not been caught unaware of Van Dorn's raid. Grant had placed his U.S. cavalry on a 24-hour watch to protect his supply line. U.S. cavalry commander T. Lyle Dickie had warned Grant that Van Dorn had left Grenada and was headed northeast. Grant had warned commanders of Van Dorn's raid by telegraph post to no avail. Colonel Murphy had been warned by Grant twice that Van Dorn was headed his way, but Murphy did nothing to prepare for battle. Grant's wife Julia and son Jesse were not in Holly Springs during Van Dorn's raid. Julia and Jesse had left Holly Springs the night before to meet with Grant at Oxford.   

Van Dorn's raid directly coincided with Grant's General Order No. 11, issued by Grant less than 72 hours earlier, that expelled Jews as a class from Grant's military district.  Grant had believed Jewish traders violated cotton trade regulations by the U.S. Treasury Department. Van Dorn's raid destroyed and disrupted U.S. communications lines. Additionally, Confederate General Bedford Forrest, on an earlier raid, starting December 10, had destroyed communication lines and fifty miles of the Mobile & Ohio Railroad behind Grant's front line.  Van Dorn's cavalry raid delayed the implementation of Grant's General Order No. 11 for weeks, saving many Jews from potential expulsion.

After sacking Holly Springs, Van Dorn and his men then followed the Mobile and Ohio Railroad, fought unsuccessfully at Davis's Mills, skirmished near Middleburg, Tennessee, passed around Bolivar, and returned to their Grenada base by December 28. The successful raid helped Van Dorn regain his reputation that was lost at Second Corinth.

The attacks of both Van Dorn and Forrest caused Grant to withdraw his troops to Grand Junction, Tennessee, his U.S. army living off the countryside. With the telegraph lines destroyed by Van Dorn and Forrest, Grant could not communicate his withdrawal to Sherman, who was repulsed at Chickasaw Bluffs on December 29.

Although Grant was humiliated by devastating raids of both Van Dorn and Forrest, he was not fired, owing to Grant's previous victories at Fort Henry, Fort Donelson, Shiloh, Iuka, and Corinth. President Lincoln revoked Grant's controversial General Order No. 11. Although Grant was thwarted in his first attempt to capture Vicksburg, saved by Van Dorn, Grant's second attempt was successful, capturing Vicksburg on July 4, 1863.  Grant never forgot the sting of the Confederate cavalry inflicted by Van Dorn and Forrest. He later incorporated the U.S. Cavalry as a separate fighting unit under U.S. General Phil Sheridan, during the Overland Campaign, in 1865.

Appointed cavalry commander
On January 13, 1863, Van Dorn was appointed to command all cavalry in the Department of Mississippi & East Louisiana. Then Gen. Joseph E. Johnston ordered him to join the Army of Tennessee, operating in Middle Tennessee. Van Dorn and his force left Tupelo, Mississippi, went through Florence, and reached the army on February 20 at Columbia, Tennessee. Van Dorn set up his headquarters at Spring Hill at White Hall and assumed command of all of the surrounding cavalry from there. Army commander Gen. Braxton Bragg ordered Van Dorn to protect and scout the left of the army, screening against U.S. cavalry.

Battle of Thompson's Station

Van Dorn also succeeded at Battle of Thompson's Station on March 5, 1863. There a U.S. brigade, under Col. John Coburn, left Franklin to reconnoiter to the south. About four miles short of Spring Hill, Coburn attacked a Confederate force composed of two regiments and was repulsed. Van Dorn then sent Brig. Gen. William Hicks Jackson's dismounted soldiers to make a direct frontal assault, while Brig. Gen. Bedford Forrest's troopers went around Coburn's left and into the U.S. rear. After three charges were beaten back, Jackson finally carried the U.S. position as Forrest captured Coburn's wagon train, blocking the road to Columbia and the only escape route for U.S. soldiers. Nearly out of ammunition as well as surrounded, Coburn surrendered.

First Battle of Franklin
On March 16, 1863, Van Dorn was given command of the cavalry corps of the Army of Tennessee and fought his last fight April 10 at the First Battle of Franklin, skirmishing with the cavalry of Gordon Granger and losing 137 men to Granger's 100 or so. This minor action caused Van Dorn to halt his movement and rethink his plans, and subsequently, he returned to the Spring Hill area. Bedford Forrest, commanding one of Van Dorn's cavalry brigades, criticized his judgment as a general, and an angered Van Dorn challenged Forrest to a duel. However, Forrest talked him out of it, preventing an altercation that may have been fatal to both of them.

Death

Alleged affair

Van Dorn's womanizing, rather than a military battle, led to his death. Van Dorn made his headquarters in the home of Martin Cheairs in Spring Hill, Tennessee. Ever the ladies' man, he attracted the attention of Jesse Helen Kissack Peters, the wife of a prominent local physician and state legislator, Dr. George B. Peters. Mrs. Peters, the fourth wife of Dr. Peters and nearly 25 years his junior, was described by locals as "bored" by her husband's long journeys away from home. Gossip quickly spread around town about Van Dorn's visits to Mrs. Peters' home and the couple's frequent unchaperoned carriage rides together.

When Dr. Peters returned home on April 12, he was mocked by local townsfolk for being a cuckold. Peters said he would shoot Van Dorn or any of his staff who set foot on his property. Eventually, the doctor hid outside his house one night and saw Van Dorn arrive. Peters rushed inside and found Van Dorn and his wife in a passionate embrace. He threatened to shoot Van Dorn on the spot, but the general pleaded for mercy if he would spare Mrs. Peters from any responsibility in the incident. Dr. Peters accepted this offer.

Homicide
A few weeks later, on the morning of May 7, Dr. Peters went to the Cheairs mansion. Van Dorn's staff recognized him, as he frequently stopped to obtain passes through the Confederate lines, and let him inside. Peters walked into Van Dorn's office, where the general was writing at his desk, pulled out a pistol, and shot him in the back of the head. A few minutes later, the daughter of Martin Cheairs ran outside, saying that Peters had shot Van Dorn. The general's staff found him unconscious but still alive. The shot was fatal, and Van Dorn died four hours later, never having regained consciousness.

The small caliber pistol round had traversed through Van Dorn's brain and lodged behind his forehead. He suffered cerebral herniation and eventual cardiac and respiratory arrest. Peters was later arrested by Confederate authorities but was never brought to trial for the killing. In defense of his actions, Dr. Peters stated that Van Dorn had "violated the sanctity of his home." Condemnation of Van Dorn in the southern United States was widespread, as the code of honor ran strong in the region for certain behaviors. Confederate general St. John Liddell, a brigadier in the Army of Tennessee, said there was little sympathy to be had for Van Dorn.

Aftermath
Some conspiracy theories have been spoken about Van Dorn's death, including the possibility that Dr. Peters was motivated more by politics than the sanctity of his marriage or his unmarried 15-year-old daughter's pregnancy. As a state legislator, Peters had earlier taken the oath of loyalty to the United States in Memphis, and although he divorced his wife soon after her affair was revealed, the couple later reconciled and Peters received a mysterious land grant in Arkansas. Van Dorn's sister Emily later wrote a memoir defending her brother and blaming Peters' loyalty to the United States in the war as the real reason for shooting him.

General Van Dorn was one of the three major generals in the American Civil War who died violently from personal problems. The others were U.S. Major General William "Bull" Nelson, shot as the result of a feud with then Brigadier General Jefferson C. Davis in September 1862, and Confederate Major General John A. Wharton, shot as the result of an argument with Colonel George Wythe Baylor in April 1865.

Van Dorn's body was initially transported and buried in the graveyard of his wife's family in Alabama. At his sister's request, it was returned to Mississippi and reburied next to their father at Wintergreen Cemetery in their hometown of Port Gibson.

Van Dorn's childhood home, the Van Dorn House in Port Gibson, Mississippi, is listed on the National Register of Historic Places.

Assessment
Controversial throughout his life, Van Dorn as a military commander, was an able leader of small to medium-sized groups of soldiers, particularly cavalry, but was out of his depth with larger commands. Military historian David L. Bongard described him as "aggressive, brave, and energetic but lacked the spark of genius necessary for successful high command in combat." Military historian Richard P. Weinert summarized Van Dorn: "A brilliant cavalry officer, he was a disappointment in command of large combined forces."

Military historian and biographer John C. Fredriksen described him as "a brave and capable soldier, but he proved somewhat lacking in administrative ability." Fredriksen said that Van Dorn belonged in cavalry command, where he was "back in his element" and "demonstrated flashes of brilliance" with that branch of the service. Fredriksen believed Van Dorn's successes at Holly Springs and Thompson's Station in the spring of 1863 proved he was one of the leading cavalry leaders in the Confederacy. He said that his death cost the service a "useful leader at a critical juncture of the Vicksburg campaign", noting that Van Dorn was the senior major general in the Confederate States Army when he was killed.

Physically short, impulsive, and highly emotional, Van Dorn was also a noted painter and writer of poetry. He was respected for his horsemanship and was known as a lover of women. A reporter dubbed him "the terror of ugly husbands" shortly before Van Dorn was killed.

Honors
CSS General Earl Van Dorn, a side-wheel river steamer in the Confederate States Navy, was named for him in early 1862. After destroying most of the River Defense Fleet in U.S. battles, this steamer was burned in June 1862 to prevent its capture by U.S. forces.
In 1906, the Daughters of the Confederacy of Claiborne County erected a monument to Confederate soldiers in front of the county courthouse in Port Gibson. It is topped by a portrait statue of Van Dorn.
1942, the US Army established Camp Van Dorn, a training camp near Centreville, Mississippi, in Wilkinson and Amite counties for troops during World War II, naming it in his memory. It operated until 1946.

See also

 List of American Civil War generals (Confederate)
 Van Dorn battle flag

Notes

References

Print
 
 Cannan, John, ed., War in the West: Shiloh to Vicksburg, 1862–1863, W.H. Smith Publishers, 1990, .
 Dupuy, Trevor N., Johnson, Curt, and Bongard, David L., Harper Encyclopedia of Military Biography, Castle Books, 1992, 1st Ed., .
 Eicher, David J. The Longest Night: A Military History of the Civil War. New York: Simon & Schuster, 2001. .
 Eicher, John H., and David J. Eicher, Civil War High Commands. Stanford: Stanford University Press, 2001. .
 Foote, Shelby. The Civil War: A Narrative. Vol. 1, Fort Sumter to Perryville. New York: Random House, 1958. .
 Foote, Shelby. The Civil War: A Narrative. Vol. 2, Fredericksburg to Meridian. New York: Random House, 1958. .
 Foote, Shelby. The Civil War: A Narrative. Vol. 3, Red River to Appomattox. New York: Random House, 1974. .
 Fredriksen, John C., Civil War Almanac, Checkmark Books/Infobase Publishing, 2008, .
 Johnson, Robert Underwood and Clarence C. Buel, eds. Battles and Leaders of the Civil War, vol. 1 New York: Century Co., 1884–1888. . (Later edition: New York: Castle Books, 1956 (by arrangement with A.S. Barnes & Co.), Inc.)
 Kennedy, Frances H., ed. The Civil War Battlefield Guide. 2nd ed. Boston: Houghton Mifflin Co., 1998. .
 
 Sifakis, Stewart. Who Was Who in the Civil War. New York: Facts On File, 1988. .
 
 Warner, Ezra J. Generals in Gray: Lives of the Confederate Commanders. Baton Rouge: Louisiana State University Press, 1959. .
 Weinert, Jr., Richard P. The Confederate Regular Army. Shippensburg, PA: White Mane Publishing, 1991, .
 
 Wright, Marcus J., General Officers of the Confederate Army: Officers of the Executive Departments of the Confederate States, Members of the Confederate Congress by States. Mattituck, NY: J. M. Carroll & Co., 1983. . First published in 1911 by Neale Publishing Co.

Online

 
 
 
 www.library.ci.corpus-christi.tx.us Online military biography of Van Dorn.
 encyclopediaofarkansas.net Encyclopedia Of Arkansas biography of Van Dorn.
 tennesseeencyclopedia.net Tennessee Encyclopedia biography of Van Dorn.
  U.S. National Park Service biography of Van Dorn.
 www.civilwararchive.com Copies of Van Dorn's official reports concerning Pea Ridge.
 www.tshaonline.org Texas St. Historical Assn. Biography of Van Dorn.

Further reading

 Carter, Arthur B., The Tarnished Cavalier: Major General Earl Van Dorn, C.S.A., University of Tennessee Press, 1999, .
 Cozzens, Peter, The Darkest Days of the War: The Battles of Iuka and Corinth, University of North Carolina Press, 1997, .
 DeBlack, Thomas R., With Fire and Sword: Arkansas, 1861–1874, University of Arkansas Press, 2003, .
 Hartje, Robert George, Van Dorn: The Life and Times of a Confederate General, Vanderbilt University Press, 1994, .
 Lowe, Richard, "Van Dorn's Raid on Holly Springs, December 1862" Journal of Mississippi History, #61, 1999, pp. 59–71.
 Shea, William & Hess, Earl, Pea Ridge: Civil War Campaign in the West, University of North Carolina Press, 1992. .
 Winschel, Terrance J., "Earl Van Dorn: From West Point to Mexico" Mississippi History 62, no. 3, 2000, pp. 179–97.

External links

 
 civilwarhome.com Civil War Home site biography of Van Dorn.
 blueandgraytrail.com Georgia's Blue and Gray Trail site biography of Van Dorn.
 civilwar.org Civil War Preservation Trust site biography of Van Dorn.
 
 historyofwar.org Military History Encyclopedia on the Web site biography of Van Dorn.
Correspondences of Earl Van Dorn during the American Civil War – held in the Walter Havighurst Special Collections, Miami University

1820 births
1863 deaths
People from Claiborne County, Mississippi
American people of Dutch descent
Confederate States Army major generals
People of Mississippi in the American Civil War
United States Army officers
United States Military Academy alumni
American military personnel of the Mexican–American War
Members of the Aztec Club of 1847
American people of the Seminole Wars
People murdered in Tennessee
Deaths by firearm in Tennessee
Cavalry commanders
19th-century American people